Danijel Demšar (born 8 May 1954) is a Slovene painter and illustrator of children's books.

Demšar was born in Maribor. He graduated from the Academy of Fine Arts in Ljubljana in 1979 and has since worked as a free-lance artist. He has illustrated numerous children's books and won the Levstik Award in 1984 for his illustrations for the books Kuža Luža, Mama žaba in žabčki and Kužmucke (Puddles the Dog, Mother Frog and Froggies and Puppykittens).

Selected Illustrated Works

 Angeli (Angels), written by Tone Pavček, 2012
 Palček, pomagaj! (Help me Dwarf!), written by Mira Voglar, 2008
 Otroška pesmarica 2 (Children's Songbook 2), 2006
 Krampata campata (Riddles and Poems), written by Mira Voglar, 2005
 Pogašeni zmaj (The Extinguished Dragon), written by Bina Štampe Žmavc, 2003
 Modri kačji pastir (The Blue Dragonfly), written by Polona Škrinjar, 2003
 Ernica gosenica (Erna the Caterpillar), written by Bina Štampe Žmavc, 2000
 Slovenski pesniki o jeseni (Slovenian Poets on Autumn), 1999
 Šamardalov zaklad (The Treasure of Al-Shamardal), 1997
 Slovenski pesniki o pomladi (Slovenian Poets on Spring), 1997
 Nebeške kočije (Heavenly Chariots), written by Bina Štampe Žmavc, 1994
 Kuža Luža (Puddles the Dog), written by Leopold Suhodolčan, 1984
 Kužmucke (Puppykittens), written by Marjeta Novak Kajzer, 1984
 Mama žaba in žabčki (Mother Frog and Froggies), written by Gvido Tartalja, 1983

References

Slovenian illustrators
Slovenian painters
Slovenian male painters
Living people
1954 births
Artists from Maribor
Levstik Award laureates
University of Ljubljana alumni